Mthembeni Ndevu, better known by his stage name Emtee (stylized as eMTee) is a South African rapper. He was born in Matatiele and grew up in Rockville, Soweto, where he was involved in talent shows. His career began at the age of 17, and his debut hit single, "Roll Up" was released in 2015 When he was 23. Emtee was signed to Ambitiouz Entertainment, released his debut album Avery (2015), which was commercially successful and was eventually certified platinum by Recording Industry of South Africa (RiSA).

The album was preceded by two singles: "Roll Up" and "Pearl Thusi". 

His second studio  album Manando (2017), the title referring to his late brother. His third album DIY 2 was released in 2018. He established his own record label eMtee Records in partnership with African Trap Movement  and released third studio album Logan (2021), which debuted number 1 in South Africa.

Early life 
Mthembeni Ndevu was born to Elias and Anna in the mid-sized town polokwane, situated in the Limpopo, a northern province in South Africa. He grew up in Turfloop, Polokwane, a major township in the Limpopo.

Career

Early career 
Emtee kept working on his music throughout his late teen years, opting to not repeat his final year in school, although his pass was not good enough to enter him into the major universities in South Africa.

In 2010, Emtee collaborated with South African rapper Maraza on a song titled "In It To Win It". They appeared on Channel O's show HeadRush. Before his solo career, Emtee was part of the rap trio, African Trap Movement, alongside fellow South African rappers Sjava, Saudi and their producer Ruff before they were all signed by Ambitiouz Entertainment.

2015-2019: Avery 
In early 2015, a friend of Emtee, his producer Ruff produced the beat for the song that would eventually become his debut single, "Roll Up". Emtee claimed that the entire track was recorded and finalized in two hours. "Roll Up" received major radio play in Southern Africa and peaked at the top of DJ Speedsta's hip hop chart on YFM. Wizkid and South African rapper AKA featured on the official re-release of his single, which eMTee called "Roll Up Re-Up". The late South African Rapper  AKA was also known to be the person who believed in him and helped nurture his talent when no one would and stated that AKA is also the reason for his accolades & success today.  He said that "Roll Up" was recorded within a tight schedule, because he and his team were finalizing his debut album.

At the 22nd South African Music Awards, Emtee received five nominations, winning the awards for Rap Album of The Year for Avery and Song of the Year for "Roll Up". Emtee won his second award for Song of the Year at the 2015 South African Hip Hop Awards, again for "Roll Up". "Roll Up" competed in a category where two South African gold selling artists, as well as Khuli Chana each made at least two appearances.

On December 4, 2015, Emtee's debut album Avery was released on iTunes and to domestic music retailers. eMtee was the third most played South African hip hop artist in the latter part of 2015 (10th most played artist overall).

2018-2020: New label and upcoming music 

In August 2019, Emtee announced that he was leaving his label Ambitiouz Entertainment, amid controversy.  In September 2019, Emtee established his own record label, Emtee Records under his company African Trap Movement. In November, the rapper said he would be releasing a new EP in 2020.  On 21 January 2020, Emtee announced via Twitter the working on his fourth studio album, DIY 3, in 2020. The album will serve as a follow-up to his third album DIY 2.  On 8 May 2020, Emtee released a new single, titled "Johustleburg". "Johustleburg" was first teased during Emtee's "hit battle" with fellow rapper Nasty C in April 2020. It marks the third single from Emtee in 2020, following "Wave" and "Brand New Day," which he released earlier in 2020.

2021-present: Logan
In early February 2021, his single  "iThemba" was released. The song debuted number one in South Africa.

On April 9, 2021, his fourth studio album Logan was released in South Africa. At the  2021 South African Hip Hop Awards, Logan received a nomination for Album of the Year and emtee was nominated for artist of the decade.

Personal life 
Emtee has two sons. His first son, Avery was born in 2015, and Logan in 2018. His debut album was named after Avery.

Controversies

In October 2017, Emtee accidentally exposed his genitals on Instagram Live.

Discography

Studio albums 

Released:2023

Extended plays

Singles 
"Roll Up" (2015)
"Pearl Thusi" (2015)
"Roll Up (Re-Up) feat. Wizkid & AKA" (2015)
"Couldn't" (A-Reece featuring Emtee) (2016)
"Amamenemene" (2016)
"My People" (2016)
"Ngeke feat. Fifi Cooper" (2016)
"We Up" (2016)
"Winning feat. Nasty C" (2017)
"Ghetto Hero" (2017)
"Corner Store" (2017)
"My Way feat. Sims" (2017)
"Me and You feat. Tiwa Savage" (2017)
"My Enemies" (2017)
"Manando" (2017)
"Plug" (2018)
"Thank You" (2018)
"Lesson" (2018)
"Smogolo" ft Snaayman (2019) 
"Wave" (2020)
"Brand New Day" ft Lolli (2020)
"Real In The State" ft Rich The Kid (TBA)
"Johustleburg" (2020)

Awards and nominations

References 

South African rappers
1992 births
Living people
People from Soweto
People from Johannesburg
Alumni of Barnato Park High School
South African record producers
People from the Eastern Cape